Chan Reec Madut is a judge from South Sudan who is serving as Chief Justice of South Sudan. He was appointed by Salva Kiir Mayardit.

Career 
In 2011, Madut served at the helm of the southern bureau of the South Sudan Referendum Commission. In 2013, it was reported that Madut appointed 78 legal assistants including his daughter without adhering to proper recruitment guidelines, which led to corruption allegations.

References 

South Sudanese judges
Judiciary of South Sudan
Year of birth missing (living people)
Living people